Victor Hubbard (born 18 November 1952) is an English former professional darts player who competed members in the 1980s.

Career
Hubbard qualified for the 1986 World Professional Darts Championship, beating Tony Payne in the first round before losing in the second round to Jocky Wilson.

17 years later, Hubbard joined the Professional Darts Corporation and qualified for the 2003 UK Open but lost his first match 5-0 to Steve Maish. He played in three more UK Open championships, reaching the third round in 2004 and 2005, losing to Wayne Mardle and Adrian Lewis respectively, and reaching the second round in 2006, losing to Roland Scholten. He retired from PDC darts in 2006.

Personal life
Hubbard's son James became PDC World Youth Champion in 2012 and qualified for the 2011 Grand Slam of Darts.

World Championship results

BDO
 1986: Last 16: (lost to Jocky Wilson 0–3) (sets)

References

External links

1952 births
English darts players
Living people
Sportspeople from Northumberland
Sportspeople from Liverpool
British Darts Organisation players
Professional Darts Corporation former pro tour players